Dysdera adriatica is a spider species found in Austria and the Balkans.

See also 
 List of Dysderidae species

References

External links 

Dysderidae
Spiders of Europe
Fauna of the Balkans
Spiders described in 1897